The St. John Climacus's Orthodox Church in Warsaw is an Orthodox parish church belonging to the Warsaw deanery of the diocese of Warsaw-Bielsk within the Polish Orthodox Church.

The church is located at 140 Wolska Street in the Ulrychów area of Wola district, inside the Orthodox cemetery. It was built from 1903 to 1905 at the initiative of the Archbishop of Warsaw Hieronymus (Ilya Tikhonovich Ekzemplarskii) as a burial place for his son Ivan and for the future the church hierarchy as well as serving as a church for cemetery funerals and church services for the deceased. The Orthodox parish became associated with Russian rule during the interwar period where many Orthodox churches were demolished or closed. Except for the period between 1915 and 1919, the church continued services almost uninterrupted. It was damaged during World War II, and during the Wola massacre the Germans murdered its priests, their families and the children from the Orthodox orphanage run by the parish.

The building was designed by Vladimir Pokrovsky. It mimics the appearance of 17th century church buildings in Rostov. The church contains historic icons and items from the early 20th century, including an iconostasis made by Alexandr Murashko. Murals added in the 60s and 70s are by Adam Stalony-Dobrzański and Jerzy Nowosielski. The building was renovated from 1945 to 1948 and in the 60s and 70s. Since 2003, relics of St. Bazyli Martysz in the church have been made available to worship.

The church, along with the whole area of the Wola Redoubt, was entered in the register of monuments on August 20, 2003 (No. A-54).

History

Construction 
The Orthodox church was founded as a private effort by the Archbishop of Warsaw Hieronymus within the cemetery in Wola. It was built to act as an auxiliary to St. Lawrence's Church, which had been confiscated from the Catholics after the November Uprising, but its immediate purpose was to commemorate the deceased son of the archbishop, Ivan Ilyich Ekzemplarskii.

In 1903 the archbishop acquired a plot of land with an area of 1237 square fathoms situated at the eastern cemetery wall by Wolska Street which cost 4275 rubles. On June 28, 1903 the foundation stone was laid. It was designed by architect Vladimir Pokrovsky and the building of the church and the iron fence surrounding it was entirely financed by the Archbishop of Warsaw. Construction was completed in June 1905 but the consecration, also conducted by the Archbishop, was delayed until October 15, 1905. Two weeks later the Archbishop also died. In accordance with his wishes he was buried next to his son. The ceremony, which took place in the unfinished church was led by the Archbishop of Vilnius and Lithuania Nikander and the Bishop of Chelm Eulogius. As well as Orthodox believers, Catholics and Jews were also at the funeral.

1915-1939 
In 1915, all Orthodox priests working in Warsaw were evacuated, and therefore the church was closed. It was looked after by Nikanor Skibin.

In 1919 Father Antoni Rudlewski came to Warsaw from Łódź to become pastor at the Church of the Holy Trinity in Podwale (Cerkiew Świętej Trójcy na Podwalu) and to regularly celebrate mass there. At his request, Father Jan Kowalenko also came to Warsaw and he took care of the church in Wola. At his initiative, the bell tower was erected in 1931 (the bells weigh 354 kg). Due to the return of some churches to Catholic ownership and others being demolished after the Russians left, the church in Wola became - along with the St. Mary Magdalene Cathedral in Praga - one of two free-standing Orthodox churches remaining in Warsaw.

In 1923, the murdered Metropolitan of Warsaw, Jerzy Jaroszewski, was buried in the church.

World War II 
The church, especially its lower part, was often used as a refuge for civilians during the defence of Warsaw in September 1939.

On August 5, 1944, during the Wola massacre, the pastor Archimandrite Teofan (Protasiewicz) and one of his priests, Father Antoni Kaliszewicz and his family were killed. German troops also murdered the children of the Orthodox orphanage run by the parish, its employees and dozens of people from the nearby neighbourhood hiding in the lower part of the church. A mass grave of children and staff of the orphanage is located at the church on Wolska Street.

After these events, the church was abandoned and remained unattended until January 1945. German soldiers repeatedly took part in acts of vandalism, including stealing the church's bells. The church also served as a hiding place for the civilian population during the Warsaw Uprising.

Under communism 
Continuing the efforts of his predecessor, Father Aleksander Czubuk-Podolski became the new pastor of the parish in Wola at the end of 1945 and served until 1948. At the beginning of the next decade, the technical condition of the church building was described as good, however it needed restoration.

In the 1950s, two Tchorek plaques commemorating the victims of the Wola massacre were placed in the cemetery and on Wolska Street.

In the 1960s the church was completely renovated. In 1964, the facade and its dome underwent renovation. In 1966 the interior of the building was rebuilt including a choir with a painting depicting Christ's prayer in the wilderness. In the same decade, the parish of St. John Climacus organized Orthodox religious teaching for school-age children, with classes held in the church (the pastoral facility did not have a parish house). In the early 70s around 30 children were taking part in these classes.

On the night of May 22 and on May 23, 1968, unknown perpetrators broke into the building, stealing a number of historic icons, and Orthodox items.

In 1977 the lower church was renovated. In December 1978, the building was re-dedicated because of the extensive renovations. The ceremony presided over by the Metropolitan of Warsaw and the entire Polish basilica accompanied by Archimandrite Atanazy (Kudiuk), the superior of the monastery in Zhyrovichy (Russian Orthodox Church), and a group of their priests. Repair works were still happening after the ordination of the building. In 1980, frescoes at the top of the church were completed after seven years, while in 1987 the older belfry structure was replaced, designed by Michał Sandowicz. The next year, the church's millennium celebrations of the baptism of Rus' were held, where in addition to the attending Orthodox clergy, representatives of other Christian Churches also attended. A plaque inside the church commemorates the event.

Post-1989 
In the 90s further repairs were carried out, including the restoration of frescoes in the upper church. On December 5, 1999, after the completion of the work, this was re-consecrated by the Metropolitan of Warsaw and leader of the Polish church, Metropolitan Sawa (Hrycuniak).

In 2009, on the western side of the building, a plaque in honour of Orthodox believers who died during World War II was unveiled.

In 2014, the lower part of the church was renovated again, replacing flooring and painting the ceiling. Efforts are underway for to restore Jerzy Nowosielski's frescoes due to their poor condition because of mould and damp.

Architecture 
While creating the Orthodox Church, Vladimir Pokrovsky took his cue from the 17th century religious architecture of the Rostov region. The expressive style the Russians had to remain in contrast with the appearance of the St. Lawrence's Church, which, according to the designer of the new church, too clearly retained the external features of Catholic religious art.

The building was built on a Latin cross of stone and brick. It is topped with a single copper onion-dome with a cross. On the eastern wall there is a plaque with an inscription in Russian commemorating the founder and describing the circumstances of the creation of the church. The entrance to the church on the west side leads through an extended porch (an element also found in the architecture of Rostov), on which is a triangular tympanum with a fresco of the figure of the Mother of God. From the outside, it is decorated with decorative details also typical of the construction in Rostov, including the temples of the Rostov Kremlin. Portals, naves and an aisle filled with Acroterion, resembling an onion dome of the church at the same time. A frieze of semicircular Acroterion is on the drum, below the row of windows.

The church has two floors, which are independent with each area adapted for the purpose of worship.

The upper section 
The patron of the church is devoted to the holy monk, John Climacus. According to the original design, the church was supposed to be extremely modest in comparison with other Orthodox churches built by the Russians in Warsaw, as it was completely devoid of frescoes on the walls. This was a result of the building being in the cemetery. Currently the walls are decorated with paintings by Adam Stalony-Dobrzański and Sotiris Pantopulos. Adam Stalony-Dobrzański made the stained glass windows of the church.

The iconostasis is the work of Alexandr Murashko, who had previously performed the work of decorating (among others), the Church of the Archangel Michael in Warsaw. His Orthodox icons are clearly influenced by the work of Viktor Vasnetsov, in particular images of the saints of St Volodymyr's Cathedral in Kyiv. The iconostasis is carved from oak. It has three-rows, decorated with small columns in the style of the Romanesque Revival, with rosettes and acroterion. In the first row of icons on the door of deacons, is a scene of the Annunciation and four images of the Evangelists. Traditionally, the left side was an icon of a patron of the church, and on both sides of the royal doors - images of Jesus Christ and the Virgin Mary. On the right side is as icon of St. Jerome. Over the royal doors are a much smaller, rectangular icon of Christ of the Acheiropoieta type. The second row of icons formed present St. Alexandra, St. Basil the Great, the Last Supper, St. John Chrysostom and St. Nicholas. The highest area are composed of round icons of St. Peter, St. Paul and a centrally located Trinity.

Since 1986 the royal door has a copy of the Pochayiv of Our Lady icon, made in Warsaw and dedicated in Pochayiv Lavra. After the return of the St. Lawrence Church to the Catholic church, a further three icons that originally were in that church were returned.

On the altar there is an icon of the Resurrection and a series of icons representing selected great feasts of the Orthodox Church. On the other side from the aisle, on both sides are iconostasis of the saints, Sergius of Radonezh and Seraphim of Sarov. On the right side of the iconostasis was placed the Golgotha and an icon of Christ the Suffering, by proto-deacon Semenov. Other saints whose images are worshiped in the church are: St. Andrew the Apostle, St. Olga of Kiev, and St. Vladimir the Great (icons inserted for the millennium of the Baptism of Kievan Rus') and imported from pilgrimages to Athos including copies of the Icon of Our Lady and St. John Ruthenian. In the atrium is suspended an image reproduction of the Sermon of Christ in the Boat. Equipment in the church is constantly enriched and renewed.

Special icons are of the venerated St. Nicholas and a copy of the Our Lady of Kazan, placed in 2001 and a decorated icon case made by Wojciech Szmeja. These images were in the church at the initiative of the founder. Since 2003, the church also has relics of Bazyli Martysz, one of the martyrs of Chełm and Podlasie.

The lower section 
The lower section of the church is devoted to St Elijah and St. Jerome, patron saints of the temple's founder. The work of decorating the lower part of the building was led by Pyotr Fedders. There is a single-row iconostasis made by Vladimir Inokentiev of pink and black marble, imported specially for the purpose from Sweden. The altar is made of the same material, under which Archbishop Hieronymus is buried. The walls of the church are covered with paintings by A. Korelin, who also made the glass icon of Christ Pantocrator surrounded by the Apostles. Between 1977 and 1979 existing wall decoration were replaced by frescoes by Jerzy Nowosielski. They present selected scenes from the history of salvation, and on the east wall is an image of Our Lady of Orans. The central marble analogion at the bottom of the church is also the tomb of the Metropolitan of Warsaw Jerzy.

In his will, the archbishop asked that the appearance of the lower part of the church was not changed and was not to be used for subsequent funerals. For burials of other people, land adjacent to the church to the east was to be allocated. This, however, was not satisfied, as there are others buried in the church with him. In addition, in 1944 there was a project widening the lower chapel to be able to take further burials. This plan was finally realized in 1978.

Connected with the church 
Protopriest Nikolai Lopatinskii, who served in the church from 1905 to 1906, was awarded a gold cross.

In the second half of the 20th century, parish pastors have included Jerzy Klinger and Aleksy Znosko, who were theologians and professors of the Christian Theological Academy (Chrześcijańska Akademia Teologiczna) in Warsaw.

In the 21st century, from 2003-2007 Paisjusz (Martyniuk) was the parish priest, and he later became the bishop of the diocese of Przemysl-Nowy Sacz.

Guests of the church 
The church has many visitors from different hierarchies of the Orthodox Church, coming on official visits to the Polish Orthodox Church. Among them were the Constantinople patriarchs Dimitri and Bartholomew, the Patriarch of Jerusalem Theophilos III, the Romanian Patriarch Teoctist, the Serbian Patriarch Pavle, the Archbishop of Athens Christodoulos, the Albanian Metropolitan Anastasios, the Metropolitan of the Czech lands and Slovakia Christopher, metropolitans from America and Canada Theodosius and Herman, archbishops Paul and Leo from Kuopio in Finland, the Metropolitan of Leningrad Alexy, the Metropolitan of Minsk and Slutsk Philaret, the Metropolitan of Astana and Kazakhstan Aleksander (Mogilow), the Metropolitan of Montenegro and the Littoral Amfilohije and other Orthodox bishops from Belarus, Bulgaria, Cyprus, Georgia, Greece, Italy, Portugal, Romania, Serbia and the Ukraine.

Bibliography 
 
 Adam Misijuk, Parafia prawosławna św. Jana Klimaka w Warszawie na Woli, „Kalendarz Prawosławny 2005”, Warszawska Metropolia Prawosławna, Warszawa 2004, ISSN 1425-2171

Eastern Orthodox churches in Poland
Churches in Warsaw
Church buildings with domes
Nazi war crimes in Poland
20th-century churches in Poland
20th-century Eastern Orthodox church buildings